RAC 1 is the main Catalan language private radio station. It is mainly owned by Grupo Godó and is based in Barcelona. It has a sister radio station, RAC 105, dedicated to chart music.

RAC 1 is a spoken-word radio station, and focuses on news and current affairs, politics, sports and culture. It started broadcasting in 2000 and has been steadily rising in audience ratings to its current 1st position amongst Catalan-language stations.

Its most successful programme Minoria Absoluta, a lunchtime humorous round-up of politics and news is, nowadays, Catalonia's most listened-to radio show.
Its most listened-to programme is El món a RAC1. It is the morning magazine of reference in Catalonia. Presented by Jordi Basté, it treats today's news, policy, humor and entertainment. In addition it is the most listened-to radio program in Catalonia.

Main shows 
 El món a RAC1
 Minoria Absoluta
 Versió Rac1
 Primer Toc
 Tu diràs

See also
 List of radio stations in Catalan

Radio stations in Catalonia
Catalan-language radio stations
Radio stations established in 2000
Mass media in Barcelona